Acraea orinata is a butterfly in the family Nymphalidae. It is found from Cameroon to the Democratic Republic of the Congo and in the Central African Republic, Rwanda, Uganda, Ethiopia and north-western Tanzania.

Description
Very close to Acraea orina q.v.

Taxonomy
It is a member of the Acraea circeis species group - but see also Pierre & Bernaud, 2014

References

External links

 Die Gross-Schmetterlinge der Erde 13: Die Afrikanischen Tagfalter. Plate XIII 57 a 
Images representing  Acraea orinata at Bold.

Butterflies described in 1893
orinata
Butterflies of Africa